Nordstad is a development area in north-central Luxembourg, and a colloquial term to refer to the combined urban areas in the region.  The name is Luxembourgish for 'northern city', but it remains the title, both formal and informal, of the region in any language.

The idea was coined by Luxembourgish economist Adrien Ries on 2 June 1973.  The idea of a unified urban area in the north of the country was put forward to decentralise and diversify the economy, and develop a third major urban area, along with Luxembourg City and the southern Red Lands.

Extent
Nordstad includes a total of fifteen communes, predominantly in the canton of Diekirch, but also including communes in Mersch and Vianden.

The fifteen communes are:
Diekirch canton: Bettendorf, Bourscheid, Diekirch, Ermsdorf, Erpeldange, Ettelbruck, Feulen, Medernach, Mertzig, Reisdorf, and Schieren.
Mersch canton: Bissen, Colmar-Berg, and Nommern.
Vianden canton: Tandel.

Altogether, the fifteen communes have a population of 33,233, or approximately 7% of Luxembourg's total population.  This is over an area of 301.8 km², which is 12% of Luxembourg's territory.  Thus, the whole Nordstad region is more sparsely populated than Luxembourg as a whole, despite Nordstad's name.

Core communes
Development activity in Nordstad is concentrated on the centre, and most urbanised area, formed by the six core communes of Bettendorf, Colmar-Berg, Diekirch, Erpeldange, Ettelbruck, and Schieren.  Except Colmar-Berg, all of them are in Diekirch canton, and lie in the valley of the middle Sauer.  Of the six, Diekirch and Ettelbruck have city status and rank within the top twenty most-populated communes in the Grand Duchy.

As of 2021, the six communes within the core of Nordstad have a combined population of 25,958; this would rank Nordstad as fourth amongst Luxembourg's cities (after Luxembourg City, Esch-sur-Alzette and Differdange, but larger than Dudelange and Pétange).  However, this population is spread over an area of 68.29 km², almost five times the size of Esch.  As the government development agency, the IVL, recognises, for Nordstad to develop into a coherent urban area in actuality and in the public imagination, Nordstad must grow and its existing towns and cities must become more integrated with one another.

Geography of Luxembourg
Diekirch (canton)
Mersch (canton)
Vianden (canton)
Diekirch
Ettelbruck